Molly Mitchell Spearman (born January 23, 1954) is an American educator and politician who served as the South Carolina Superintendent of Education from 2015 to 2023. She is a Republican.

She grew up on her family's farm in Saluda County, South Carolina. She received a B.A. in music education from Lander University, has a master's degree in education supervision from George Washington University, and an education specialist degree from the University of South Carolina.

She taught music at public schools, served four terms in the South Carolina House of Representatives, and was Deputy Superintendent of Education before being elected Superintendent of Education in November 2014.

According to her biography on the state's website, she plays organ at her church.

In 2020, she worked to deal with the COVID-19 pandemic including addressing issues related to online learning and how to reopen schools safely.

References

External links
Molly Spearman website

|-

1954 births
20th-century American educators
20th-century American politicians
20th-century American women educators
20th-century American women politicians
21st-century American educators
21st-century American politicians
21st-century American women educators
21st-century American women politicians
American music educators
George Washington University alumni
Lander University alumni
Living people
Republican Party members of the South Carolina House of Representatives
People from Saluda County, South Carolina
South Carolina Superintendent of Education
University of South Carolina alumni
Women state legislators in South Carolina